Walking the Blues is an album by blues pianist and vocalist Otis Spann recorded in New York in 1960 by Candid Records but not released until 1972 by the Barnaby label.

Reception

AllMusic reviewer Thom Owens stated "Walking the Blues is arguably the finest record Otis Spann ever cut, boasting 11 cuts of astounding blues piano. On several numbers, Spann is supported by guitarist Robert Jr. Lockwood and their interaction is sympathetic, warm, and utterly inviting. ... Most importantly, however, is the fact that Walking the Blues simply sounds great -- it's some of the finest blues piano you'll ever hear.".

Track listing
All compositions by Otis Spann except where noted
 "It Must Have Been the Devil" − 3:50
 "Otis' Blues" − 4:16
 "Going Down Slow" − 3:57
 "Half Ain't Been Told" (Otis Spann, James Oden) − 4:38
 "Monkey Face Woman" (Oden) − 4:55
 "This Is the Blues" − 3:06
 "Evil Ways" (Oden) − 3:50
 "Come Day, Go Day" (Oden) − 4:10
 "Walking the Blues" − 4:55
 "Bad Condition" (Oden) − 4:21
 "My Home Is on the Delta" (McKinley Morganfield) − 3:12

Personnel
Otis Spann − vocals, piano
Robert Lockwood Jr. − guitar (tracks 1, 3-5, 7, 8, 10 & 11)
St. Louis Jimmy − vocals (tracks 3, 5, 8, 10)

References

1972 albums
Otis Spann albums
Barnaby Records albums
Candid Records albums